Alexandra López Rosillo (born 26 February 1989), commonly known as Ale, is a Spanish football defender who plays for Madrid CFF in Spain's Primera División. She previously played for Sevilla FC.

She is a member of the Spain women's national football team. After falling out of favour under Ignacio Quereda, Ale was recalled by incoming national team coach Jorge Vilda in 2015.

Honours
Rayo Vallecano	
 Primera División: Winner 2008–09, 2009–10, 2010–11

Spain
Algarve Cup: Winner 2017

References

External links
 Profile at La Liga
 Profile at aupaAthletic.com 

1989 births
Living people
Spanish women's footballers
Spain women's international footballers
Rayo Vallecano Femenino players
Primera División (women) players
Sevilla FC (women) players
Atlético Madrid Femenino players
Footballers from Seville
Women's association football defenders
Women's association football midfielders
UEFA Women's Euro 2017 players
21st-century Spanish women